Dyschiridium is a genus of beetles in the family Carabidae, containing the following species:

 Dyschiridium concinnum (Peringuey, 1926)
 Dyschiridium ebeninum Chaudoir, 1861
 Dyschiridium lastii (Bates, 1886)
 Dyschiridium subdepressum (Kolbe, 1895)

References

Panagaeinae